Milo Winter (August 7, 1888 – August 15, 1956) was an American book illustrator. He created editions of Aesop's Fables, Arabian Nights, Alice in Wonderland, A Christmas Carol, Gulliver's Travels, Tanglewood Tales (1913), and others.

Background
Winter was born in Princeton, Illinois and trained at Chicago's School of the Art Institute.  He lived in Chicago until the early 1950s, when he moved to New York City. From 1947 to 1949, he was the art editor of Childcraft books and from 1949, was the art editor in the film strip division of Silver Burdett Company.

Gallery

See also
A Christmas Carol (1971 film)

References

Peter Falk, Who Was Who in American Art, 1985

External links

 
 Milo Winter on Pinterest
 
 

1888 births
1956 deaths
American children's book illustrators